Murchison Bay Hospital is a hospital in the  Central Region of Uganda. This facility serves as the national referral hospital for prisoners in the Uganda Prisons Service.

Location
The coordinates of the prison, where this hospital is located are 00°17'58.0"N, 32°38'30.0"E (Latitude:0.299441; Longitude:32.641658).

Overview
This hospital serves the inmate population of Luzira Maximum Prison. Some of the ailments treated include HIV/AIDS, tuberculosis and mental illnesses. In January 2014, the hospital expanded services by opening a new maternity wing. Cases that cannot be handled at this hospital are referred to Mulago National Referral Hospital.

See also
List of hospitals in Uganda

References

External links
 Assessing Adherence to Standard Infection Control Guidelines at Murchison Bay Hospital, Kampala As of November 2016.

Hospitals in Uganda
Kampala District
Central Region, Uganda
Hospitals established in 1962
1962 establishments in Uganda